A gypsy tart is a type of tart made with evaporated milk, muscovado sugar (though some varieties include light brown sugar), and pastry. It originates from the Isle of Sheppey in the county of Kent.

The tart is extremely sweet and is, for many people, associated with school dinners. Although most will know the version of gypsy tart made with evaporated milk, it can also be made with condensed milk in place of evaporated milk. This makes a firmer and even sweeter tart, with a darker colour. A legend says that a woman invented the tart to feed hungry gypsy children.

References

Tarts
British desserts
English cuisine
British pies
History of Kent
Isle of Sheppey